The All-Union First Programme  was a radio channel in the Soviet Union. It had a political focus and discussed events in the Soviet Union. Since 1991 it was a small commercial radio station broadcasting with the name "Radio-1". "Radio-1" ceased broadcasting on 21 June 2010.

History 

The All-Union Radio was established in 1924 in the Soviet Union. It broadcast from Moscow. 

The channel was changed to the All Union First Programme in 1945 with a political focus.

The All Union First Programme transmitted its program set over mediumwave and VHF.

In connection with the dissolution of the USSR, the All Union First Programme ceased its transmission in December 1991. In Russia, Radio-1 began broadcasting on the former frequencies of the All Union First Programme. The other open frequencies of the All Union First Programme were taken over by the state radio channels of the newly independent republics.

See also
Broadcasting in the Soviet Union
Eastern Bloc information dissemination

Eastern Bloc mass media
Radio stations in Russia
Radio stations in the Soviet Union
Radio stations established in 1924
Radio stations disestablished in 2010
Defunct radio stations in Russia